Making a Door Less Open is the twelfth album by American indie rock band Car Seat Headrest. It was released on May 1, 2020, via Matador Records. The album serves as the band's fourth for the label and the second to consist of newly written material.

Making a Door Less Open marks a distinct stylistic divergence from the band's previous material. While Car Seat Headrest largely became known for their indie rock sound and use of "lo-fi" aesthetics, the style of the album was largely influenced by experiments with 1 Trait Danger, the electronic side-project of band members Will Toledo and Andrew Katz.

Background 
Writing for Making a Door Less Open began in January 2015, prior to the band's signing to Matador Records. Lead singer/songwriter Will Toledo began developing the songs electronically, with the ideas later being fleshed out into full songs in 2018. The first song conceived for the project would go on to become the opening track, Weightlifters. Unlike previous Car Seat Headrest albums, Making a Door Less Open would end up being produced with more emphasis on the individual tracks, due to the increased prominence of streaming and playlists in modern music consumption. This would result in three separate versions of the album's track-list across release formats: vinyl, CD, and streaming.

Toledo, in an official write-up on the album titled "Newness and Strangeness", wrote, "The songs [from Making a Door Less Open] contain elements of EDM, hip hop, futurism, doo-wop, soul, and of course rock and roll. But underneath all these things I think these may be folk songs, because they can be played and sung in many different ways, and they're about things that are important to a lot of people: anger with society, sickness, loneliness, [and] love."

Recording and release 
In an August 2018 interview with Matt Wilkinson, Toledo confirmed that he was demoing out new material for the band, adding that, "there might be some stuff that surprises people who only know us as a rock band, but I don’t think it will come as a surprise to people who are checking out all the deep cuts". In January 2019, percussionist Andrew Katz confirmed the band was in the studio recording new music through a video uploaded on Instagram.

Following the tease of new music, the band began experimenting with new material at live shows, initially debuting the tracks "Weightlifters" and "Hollywood" at The Vera Project in December 2018. The band would also tease the song "Stop Lying to Me" as a part of their TIDAL documentary series, "I Haven't Done Sh*t This Year" in July 2019.

On February 3, 2020, Car Seat Headrest began sharing an abstract series of artworks created by Cate Wurtz on Twitter and Instagram, featuring mysterious captions. This continued throughout the month before concluding on February 26, 2020, when Making a Door Less Open was officially announced by the band, along with the release of the album's first single, "Can't Cool Me Down". The album's announcement also coincided with the introduction of "Trait", an alternative persona of Toledo's which had originally stemmed from the band's side-project, 1 Trait Danger. The character is presented wearing a gas-mask with LED eyes, and a hi-viz jacket and pants. Toledo explained his reasoning for introducing the character as the result of performance anxiety, and a wish to "remind [himself] and everyone else to have some fun with it."

"Trait" would go on to appear in the lyric video for the album's second single, "Martin", released on March 23, and the animated music video for the album's third single, "Hollywood", released on April 16.

Making a Door Less Open would officially release on May 1, 2020, the 10 year anniversary of Car Seat Headrest's first album, 1. As the album also released amid the 2020 COVID-19 pandemic, the band's planned North American tour was cancelled, later being rescheduled to 2022.

Accolades

Track listing 
All tracks are written by Will Toledo, except "Hollywood", written by Toledo and Andrew Katz.

Personnel 
Credits are adapted from Bandcamp, and the album's vinyl liner notes.

Car Seat Headrest
 Will Toledo – vocals, synthesizers, keyboards, organ, guitar, piano, drum programming 
 Andrew Katz – drums, drum programming, vocals 
 Ethan Ives – guitars, vocals 
 Seth Dalby – bass guitar

Additional musicians
 Gianni Aiello – guitar 
 John Huggins – violin 

Production
 Will Toledo – production, mixing, engineering
 Andrew Katz – production, mixing, mastering (digital)
 John McRae – engineering
 Bernie Grundman – mastering (vinyl)
 Cate Wurtz – artwork

Charts

References 

2020 albums
Car Seat Headrest albums
Matador Records albums